Ali al-Muqri (Arabic: علي المقري) (born in Taiz) is a Yemeni novelist and writer.  Two of hisnovels - Black Taste, Black Odour and The Handsome Jew - have been long-listed for the Arab Booker Prize. He has also been awarded the French Prize for Arabic Literature for his novel Ḥurma (Femme interdite), translated into French by Khaled Osman and Ola Mehanna.

Al-Muqri's work has been published in Banipal magazine, The New York Times, and in French newspaper La Libération. In 1997, he became editor-in-chief of Al-Ḥikmah, the journal of the Yemeni Writers Association. He later served as the editor of literary journal Ǧaymān. In 2015, he fled to Paris after receiving death threats for writing sexually charged books.

List of publications

 Nāfiḏat lil-ğasad (A Window into the Body) (1987)
 Tarmīmāt (Restorations) (1999; 2000)
  Yaḥdat fī al-nasī'ān (It Comes with Forgetfulness) (2003) 
 al-Khamr wa-al-nabīdh fī al-islām  (Wine and Nabīd in Islam) (2007)
 Ṭaʿm aswad…Rā’iḥah sawdā’ (Black Taste, Black Odour) (2008)
  Al-Yahūdī al-Ḥālī (The Handsome Jew) (2009) - translated also into French, Le Beau Juif (2011), as also into Italian, Il Bell’Ebreo (2012) 
 Ḥurmah (Woman) (2012) - translated also into French, La Femme Interdite, "(2015), as also in English, Hurma (2015), "Donna proibita" in italian (2021)
 Bukhūr ‘Adanī (Adeni Incense) (2014)

References

External links
 An Interview with the Author
 Yemeni author defends minority rights in Yemen
 Ali al-Muqri

Living people
20th-century Yemeni novelists
People from Taiz
Year of birth missing (living people)
21st-century Yemeni novelists